Communauté d'agglomération du Pays de l'Or is the communauté d'agglomération, an intercommunal structure, centred on the town of Mauguio. It is located in the Hérault department, in the Occitania region, southern France. Created in 1993, its seat is in Mauguio. Its area is 114.8 km2. Its population was 44,890 in 2019, of which 16,705 in Mauguio proper.

Composition
The communauté d'agglomération consists of the following 8 communes:

Candillargues
La Grande-Motte
Lansargues
Mauguio
Mudaison
Palavas-les-Flots
Saint-Aunès
Valergues

References

Pays de l'Or
Pays de l'Or